Tropidomantis is a genus of praying mantis in the family Nanomantidae, with species recorded from Asia and the Pacific islands.

Species
Three species in the restored genus Eomantis were previously placed here as a subgenus.  The Mantodea Species File now lists the following species:
 Tropidomantis gressitti Tinkham, 1937
Tropidomantis kawaharai Brannoch, 2018
 Tropidomantis tenera (Stal, 1858) - type species

References

External links

Mantodea genera
Nanomantidae
Insects of Southeast Asia